ServiceMarket is an online home services marketplace based in the UAE. The website allows customers to get quotes and book home services as well as read reviews of service providers.

Funding 
ServiceMarket (previously MoveSouq) successfully closed its first and second rounds of funding in 2013 and 2015. In September 2016, the Dubai-based startup announced that it had closed a US$3 million Series A funding round led by a Russia-based venture capital firm.

References

External links 
 ServiceMarket Website

Online marketplaces of the United Arab Emirates